Lawrence Francis O'Brien Jr. (July 7, 1917September 28, 1990) was an American politician and basketball commissioner. He was one of the United States Democratic Party's leading electoral strategists for more than two decades. He was Postmaster General in the cabinet of President Lyndon Johnson and chair of the Democratic National Committee. He also was commissioner of the National Basketball Association from 1975 to 1984.  The NBA Championship Trophy is named after him.

O'Brien, son of Irish immigrants, was born in Springfield, Massachusetts. When he was not working in politics, O'Brien managed his family's real estate and worked in public relations.

Early life and politics
O'Brien was born on July 7, 1917, in Springfield, Massachusetts. He learned about politics at a young age. His father, a local leader of the Democratic Party, recruited him at 11 years old to serve locally as a volunteer in the 1928 presidential campaign of Al Smith. O'Brien became a passionate Democrat. He earned a bachelor's degree in law in 1942 at the Northeastern University – Springfield Division, now known as the Western New England University School of Law. O'Brien was married to the former Elva Brassard in 1945. They had one son, Lawrence F. O'Brien III, who became a lobbyist.

He was appointed in 1946, 1948, and 1950 by his friend Foster Furcolo to serve locally as the director of the U.S. House of Representatives election campaigns. O'Brien was appointed in 1952 by John F. Kennedy to serve in Massachusetts as the director of his successful U.S. Senate election campaign and, in 1958, to serve in Massachusetts as the director of his successful reelection campaign. Kennedy's elections were largely attributed to O'Brien's recruitment, his use of volunteers, and his insistence upon reaching voters in every corner of every state .

In 1959, he built the foundation for Kennedy's 1960 presidential campaign by canvassing the United States and working to connect with state Democratic stakeholders. O'Brien was appointed as Kennedy's national campaign director. His election planning in key primary states such as Wisconsin and West Virginia helped to defuse the party heavyweights' anxiety about Kennedy's Catholicism.

In 1960, he was appointed by President-elect Kennedy to recruit staff for his administration and subsequently took on the job 1961 as the special assistant to the president for congressional relations and personnel. O'Brien  also had a major role in awarding patronage as one of President Kennedy's inner circle of trusted advisers. 

O'Brien's grassroots campaign strategies eventually inspired a new trend in Democratic party primary and general election processes, employing his "statewide strategy" as an update to traditional reliance on major city "political machines". As DNC chair he established a control structure for communications with state delegates and "dignitaries" which exists to this day; an achievement which cemented his role as perennial  party leadership candidate. 

O'Brien accompanied President Kennedy and Jackie Kennedy on their trip to Texas in November 1963 and was riding in the motorcade in Dallas. As such he was an eyewitness to the assassination of President Kennedy. After the president was declared dead, O'Brien accompanied the coffin and Jackie Kennedy back to Air Force One at Love Field in Dallas. While aboard Air Force One, President Johnson called for O'Brien and Kenny O'Donnell, asking both of them to stay on and work with him in the new administration. Although O'Brien had never been close to Johnson (and many writers, including Johnson biographer Robert Caro, reported that O'Brien did not like or trust Johnson), he remained at the White House and worked for the new president - which was a pretty strong career decision even if he harbored doubts about Johnson's role in the assassination. 

O'Brien played his cards so well that he was appointed as President Lyndon B. Johnson's campaign director in 1964. A newly elected Johnson appointed O'Brien to serve as special assistant to the president for congressional relations and personnel which continued through 1965 when O'Brien was appointed U.S. Postmaster General.

Then in 1968 after Johnson refused to seek the Democratic nomination again, O'Brien unsurprisingly reclaimed a position as Senator Robert F. Kennedy's  campaign advisor. After RFK was assassinated, Vice President Hubert Humphrey hired O'Brien to serve as his national presidential campaign director.

O'Brien was also elected as national DNC chairman in 1968 on the tails of his Humphrey campaign job. He became infamous during the 1968 Democratic convention in Chicago by engineering a series of party convention rule changes which served to exclude Eugene McCarthy delegates from certain roles in the convention and disallowed commentary on Humphrey's Vietnam War involvement. After re-election as chair in 1970, it was in this role that he became a central figure in both the Watergate scandal and the "Eagleton Affair" in 1972.

The DNC Lawrence O'Brien Award was created in 1992 by his family and the Democratic Party leaders to acknowledge the many years of service he gave to the party, his belief in the importance of volunteer contribution, and his role as counter-fixer to Cohn, Stone, and Mitchell et al. In his varied roles during the 60's and early 70's O'Brien defined the role that we now recognize as the modern Democratic Party  'Insider'; someone who strategically inter-connects national and state party campaign fund-raising and is rewarded with governmental roles in which he then funnels favors back to those funders (not a new concept, but a modern iteration made more challenging by slowly evolving campaign finance laws.)

Government
His first post in Washington was in 1948 as Rep. Foster Furcolo's administrative assistant. 

He lobbied successfully during President Kennedy's first year for the expansion of the U.S. House of Representatives Standing Committee on rules to ensure a liberal and moderate majority. O'Brien also lobbied for increasing the minimum wage. In 1962 he acted as President Kennedy's liaison to the Democratic Party during its mid-term election campaigns.

During that tenure, in September 1967, the Post Office Department cancelled many "mail by rail" contracts, electing to move First Class mail via air and road transport. This had a devastating effect on passenger train revenues and led directly to the end of many passenger rail routes which had relied on mail contracts to supplement their income  (see: Railway post office).

The U.S. National Archives and Records Administration Lawrence F. O'Brien Gallery was named and opened in 2004 in his memory.

NBA commissioner
Appointed commissioner in 1975, O'Brien oversaw the ABA–NBA merger and negotiated a broadcast agreement with CBS Television while seeing game attendance significantly increase. In response to public relations issues after the merger, O'Brien pushed for an anti-drug agreement with the NBA Players Association to improve the league's image. And, although the merger and expansion had solidified the NBA brand and games were broadcast live on weekend days, it still did not have the TV exposure of other pro sports. In the late 70's, and even into 1980 season, CBS was showing only tape-delayed broadcasts of weekday NBA playoff and Finals games after the late news. CBS would ultimately become synonymous with the great NBA Finals battles of the 80's. 

After retirement (1984), in honor of his service to the sport, the NBA Championship Trophy was renamed as the Larry O'Brien NBA Championship Trophy.

O'Brien was inducted into the Naismith Memorial Basketball Hall of Fame in 1991, located at his birthplace, Springfield, Massachusetts.

NBA career highlights
 Negotiated the ABA–NBA merger as the Denver Nuggets, San Antonio Spurs, Indiana Pacers, and New York Nets joined the league and the Kentucky Colonels and Spirits of St. Louis were bought out and Virginia Squires folded
 League grew from 18 to 23 teams (the four ABA teams and the expansion Dallas Mavericks)
 Coordinated the NBA's richest TV contract to date (1982)
 Brought the NBA to cable television (ESPN and USA) in 1982, establishing the league as a pioneer of cable TV
 Negotiated two landmark collective bargaining agreements (1976, 1983)
 Modified the college draft and restored peace to a league in the midst of legal turmoil (1976)
 Introduced salary cap (1983)
 Orchestrated the 1976 settlement of the Oscar Robertson suit, creating a fair and equitable system of free agency for veterans
 Annual NBA attendance reached 10 million during his tenure
 Gate receipts doubled and television revenue tripled during his time as commissioner
 Established NBA College Scholarship program (1980)
 Reached a stringent anti-drug agreement with the NBA Players Association (1983)
 Oversaw the adoption of the three-point field goal in the NBA (1979)

Death
O'Brien died of cancer after surgery in Manhattan, New York, on September 28, 1990, at the age of 73, and was interred in St. Michaels Cemetery in Springfield, Massachusetts.

References

External links
 Oral History Interviews with Lawrence O'Brien, from the Lyndon Baines Johnson Library

|-

|-

1917 births
1990 deaths
20th-century American lawyers
20th-century American politicians
American people of Irish descent
Catholics from Massachusetts
Deaths from cancer in New York (state)
Democratic National Committee chairs
Lyndon B. Johnson administration cabinet members
Massachusetts lawyers
Naismith Memorial Basketball Hall of Fame inductees
National Basketball Association commissioners
Northeastern University alumni
Politicians from Springfield, Massachusetts
Western New England University alumni
United States congressional aides
United States Postmasters General